The Hillberg carbine was a light rifle concept for the US armed forces during WW2. It featured a gas-operated operation that moved the barrel forward rather than the bolt to the rear. The layout of the rifle was later used in the Whitney Wolverine pistol.

References

material from Forgotten Weapons

.30 Carbine firearms
Carbines
Rifles of the United States
Trial and research firearms of the United States